The Station Fire was the largest wildfire of the 2009 California wildfire season, as well as the largest wildfire in the history of Los Angeles County, that burned in the Angeles National Forest, igniting on August 26, 2009 near the U.S. Forest Service ranger station on the Angeles Crest Highway. Two firefighters, Captain Tedmund Hall and Firefighter Specialist Arnie Quinones, died on August 30, when their fire truck plunged off a cliff during an attempt to set backfires to slow the blaze. The blaze threatened 12,000 structures in the National Forest and the nearby communities of La Cañada Flintridge, Pasadena, Glendale, Acton, La Crescenta, Juniper Hills, Littlerock and Altadena, as well as the Sunland and Tujunga neighborhoods of the City of Los Angeles. Many of these areas faced mandatory evacuations as the flames drew near, but as of September 6, all evacuation orders were lifted. The Station Fire burned on the slopes of Mount Wilson, threatening numerous television, radio and cellular telephone antennas on the summit, as well as the Mount Wilson Observatory, which includes several historically significant telescopes and multimillion-dollar astronomical facilities operated by UCLA, USC, UC Berkeley and Georgia State University. A 40-mile (64-kilometer) stretch of the Angeles Crest Highway was closed until 2010, due to guardrail and sign damage, although the pavement remained largely intact.

The fire
On September 3, officials announced that the Station Fire was caused by arson and that a homicide investigation had been initiated because of the deaths of the firefighters involved. Investigators discovered a substance at the fire's point of origin which they believe may have accelerated the flames. The two firefighters, supervisors of inmate fire crews (jointly operated by the Los Angeles County Fire Department and California Department of Corrections), had been conducting ignition operations in order to protect personnel and Mt Gleason Camp 16 from the advancing fire front. On September 15, $93.8 million (2009 USD) had been spent fighting the fire, and the fire was 91% contained, with full containment expected by September 19. However, the Station Fire continued to persist into the month of October. The Station Fire was 100% contained at 7:00 pm PST on Friday, October 16, 2009, due to moderate rainfall from a powerful storm system passing through. At ,  the Station Fire was at the time the 9th largest wildfire in modern California history. It remains the largest wildfire in the modern history of Los Angeles County, surpassing the  Clampitt Fire of September 1970.

Night flights
The U.S. Forest Service had banned night flights in wildfires after the death of a helicopter pilot in 1977. But as a result of the Station Fire, several California lawmakers led by Representative Adam Schiff successfully lobbied the U.S. Forest Service to end the ban on night flights, which they did in 2012.

Gallery

See also
2009 California wildfires
October 2009 North American storm complex
Bobcat Fire

References

2009 California wildfires
2009 murders in the United States
Wildfires in Los Angeles County, California
Angeles National Forest
San Gabriel Mountains
California wildfires caused by arson
August 2009 crimes in the United States